Following is a list of restaurants in Atlanta:

 Ann's Snack Bar
 Antico Pizza
 Fellini's Pizza
 FLIP Burger Boutique
 Junior's Grill
 Mary Mac's Tea Room
 Mellow Mushroom
 Moe's Southwest Grill
 Mrs. Winner's Chicken & Biscuits
 Roly Poly
 Shane's Rib Shack
 Taco Mac
 The Varsity
 The Vortex Bar & Grill

Restaurants
Atlanta